Mozaffar ad-Din Shah Qajar (23 March 1853 – 3 January 1907), was the fifth shah of Qajar Iran, reigning from 1896 until his death in 1907. He is often credited with the creation of the Persian Constitution of 1906, which he approved of as one of his final actions as Shah.

Biography
The son of the Qajar ruler Naser al-Din Shah Qajar, Mozaffar al-Din was named crown prince and sent as governor to the northern province of Azerbaijan in 1861. He spent his 35 years as crown prince in the pursuit of pleasure; his relations with his father were frequently strained, and he was not consulted in important matters of state. Thus, when he ascended the throne in May 1896, he was unprepared for the burdens of office.

At Mozaffar al-Din's accession Persia faced a financial crisis, with annual governmental expenditures far in excess of revenues as a result of the policies of his father. During his reign, Mozzafar ad-Din attempted some reforms of the central treasury; however, the previous debt incurred by the Qajar court, owed to both England and Russia, significantly undermined this effort. He furthered this debt by borrowing even more funds from Britain, France, and Russia.  The income from these later loans was used to pay earlier loans rather than create new economic developments.  In 1908, oil was discovered in Persia but Mozzaffar ad-Din had already awarded William Knox D'Arcy, a British subject, the rights to oil in most of the country in 1901. 

Like his father he visited Europe three times. During these periods, on the encouragements of his chancellor Amin-os-Soltan, he borrowed money from Nicholas II of Russia to pay for his extravagant traveling expenses. During his first visit he was introduced to the "cinematographe" in Paris, France. Immediately falling in love with the silver screen the Shah ordered his personal photographer to acquire all the equipment and knowledge needed to bring the moving picture to Persia, thus starting Persian cinema. The following is a translated excerpt from the Shah's diary:

Additionally, in order to manage the costs of the state and his extravagant personal lifestyle Mozzafar ad-din Shah decided to sign many concessions, providing foreigners with monopolistic control of various Persian industries and markets. One example was the D'Arcy Oil Concession.

Widespread fears amongst the aristocracy, educated elites, and religious leaders about the concessions and foreign control resulted in some protests in 1906. These resulted in the Shah accepting a suggestion to create a Majles (National Consultative Assembly) in October 1906, by which the monarch's power was curtailed as he granted a constitution and parliament to the people. He died of a heart attack 40 days after granting this constitution and was buried in Imam Husayn Shrine in Kerbala.

Children
Sons
 Prince Mohammad-Ali Mirza E’tezad es-Saltaneh, later Mohammad-Ali Shah (1872–1925)
 Prince Malek-Mansur Mirza Shoa os-Saltaneh (1880–1920)
 Prince Abolfath Mirza Salar od-Dowleh (1881–1961)
 Prince Abolfazl Mirza Azd os-Sultan (1882–1970)
 Prince Hossein-Ali Mirza Nosrat os-Saltaneh (1884–1945)
 Prince Nasser-od-Din Mirza Nasser os-Saltaneh (1897–1977)

Daughters
 Princess Fakhr os-Saltaneh (1870 – ?) married Abdol Majid Mirza Eyn od-Dowleh
 Princess Ehteram os-Saltaneh (1871 – ?) married Morteza-Qoli Khan Hedayat Sani od-Dowleh
 Princess Ezzat od-Dowleh (1872 – 1955) married Abdol Hossein Mirza Farmanfarma
 Princess Shokuh os-Saltaneh (1880 – ?)
 Princess Shokuh od-Dowleh (1883 – ?)
 Princess Fakhr-od-Dowleh (1883 – 1955) mother of Ali Amini
 Princess Aghdas od-Dowleh (1891 – ?)
 Princess Anvar od-Dowleh (1896 – ?) married eghtedar es-Saltaneh son of Kamran Mirza
 Princess Ameneh Bratz (1930-1940)

List of premiers
 Mirza Ali-Asghar Khan Amin os-Soltan (till November 1896) (1st time)
 Post vacant (November 1896 – February 1897)
 Ali Khan Amin od-Dowleh (February 1897 – June 1898)
 Mirza Ali-Asghar Khan Amin os-Soltan (June 1898 – 24 January 1904) (2nd time)
 Prince Abdol-Majid Mirza Eyn od-Dowleh (24 January 1904 – 5 August 1906)
 Mirza Nasrollah Khan Ashtiani Moshir od-Dowleh (1906 – 18 February 1907)

Historical anecdotes

The Shah visited the United Kingdom in August 1902 with the anticipation of also receiving the Order of the Garter as it had been previously given to his father, Nasser-ed-Din Shah. King Edward VII refused to give this high honor to a non-Christian. Lord Lansdowne, the Foreign Secretary, had designs drawn up for a new version of the Order, without the Cross of St. George. The King was so enraged by the sight of the design, though, that he threw it out of his yacht's porthole. However, in 1903, the King had to back down and the Shah was appointed a member of the Order.

A nephew of his wife was Mohammed Mossadeq, the Prime Minister of Iran during the Pahlavi dynasty. Mossadeq was overthrown by a coup d'état staged by the United Kingdom and the United States in 1953.

Honours

See also
 Qajar dynasty
 Qajar family tree
 D'Arcy Concession
 Persian Constitutional Revolution
 Persian Constitution of 1906
 Anglo-Russian Entente
 Kamal ol-Molk
 Baghe Mozaffar, an Iranian TV show about a modern-day Qajar Khan
 Fakhr ol dowleh
 Samad Khan Momtaz os-Saltaneh, ambassador of Persia to Paris

References

 Walker, Richard (1998). Savile Row: An Illustrated History
 The translation of the travelogue in Issari's book: Cinema in Iran: 1900–1979 pages 58–59
 Iranian Cinema: Before the Revolution at www.horschamp.qc.ca Iranian Cinema: Before the Revolution by Shahin Parhami.
 Hamid Dabashi, Close Up: Iranian Cinema, Past, Present, and Future, 320 p. (Verso, London, 2001), Chapter 1.

External links

 Some fragmentary motion pictures of Mozaffar al-Din Shah Qajar: YouTube.
 Portrait of Mozaffar al-Din Shah Qajar: .
 Mohammad-Reza Tahmasbpoor, History of Iranian Photography: Early Photography in Iran, Iranian Artists' site, Kargah
 History of Iranian Photography. Postcards in Qajar Period, photographs provided by Bahman Jalali, Iranian Artists' site, Kargah.
 History of Iranian Photography. Women as Photography Model: Qajar Period, photographs provided by Bahman Jalali, Iranian Artists' site, Kargah.
 Photos of qajar kings

1853 births
1907 deaths
19th-century monarchs of Persia
20th-century monarchs of Persia
Mozzafar
Extra Knights Companion of the Garter
Knights of the Golden Fleece of Spain
People of the Persian Constitutional Revolution
Recipients of the Order of Saint Stanislaus (Russian)
Grand Crosses of the Order of the Star of Romania
Recipients of the Order of the White Eagle (Russia)
Recipients of the Order of St. Anna, 1st class
Knights Grand Cross of the Order of Saints Maurice and Lazarus
Grand Croix of the Légion d'honneur
Grand Crosses of the Order of Saint Stephen of Hungary
19th-century monarchs in the Middle East
Iranian slave owners